Angelina National Forest is a United States National Forest, one of four located in the piney woods region of Texas. The  Angelina National Forest is located in East Texas  in parts of San Augustine, Angelina, Jasper and Nacogdoches counties. It is managed together with the three other National Forests in Texas (Davy Crockett, Sabine, and Sam Houston) from Forest Service offices in Lufkin, Texas. There are local district offices located in Zavalla. The forest lies in the Neches River Basin and on the north and south shores of Sam Rayburn Reservoir. Longleaf pine is the predominant cover type in the southern portion of the forest, while loblolly and shortleaf pine are dominant species in the northern portion and abundant throughout.

History
Humans came to the area around 8,000 years ago. Archeological sites document the evidence of man's presence over the entire period since then.

In 1934, the Texas Legislature approved a resolution to urge federal purchase of land to create National Forests in Texas. In 1935, acquisition began on the Davy Crockett, Sam Houston, Sabine and Angelina National Forests.

Wildlife
Hundreds of wildlife species exist in the forest. Principal game species include white-tailed deer, squirrel, wild turkey, American woodcock, bobwhite quail, mourning dove and wood duck. The forest provides wintering habitat for the bald eagle. The red-cockaded woodpecker, an endangered species, is found throughout the forest.

Wilderness areas
There are two officially designated wilderness areas lying within Angelina National Forest that are part of the National Wilderness Preservation System.
 Turkey Hill Wilderness
 Upland Island Wilderness

See also
Texas Forest Trail
List of U.S. National Forests

References

External links 

Angelina National Forest USDA Forest Service - National Forests & Grasslands in Texas

National Forests of Texas
Protected areas of Angelina County, Texas
Protected areas of Nacogdoches County, Texas
Protected areas of San Augustine County, Texas
Protected areas of Jasper County, Texas
Protected areas established in 1936